is a retired Japanese professional footballer.

Career
Kinowaki, after spending his youth with Kyoto Sanga, moved to Poland to play with Energetyk Gryfino. After a season in Poland, Kinowaki moved to Latvia to play for Virslīga side, BFC Daugavpils. After a season with Daugavpils, Kinowaki moved to India and signed for newly promoted I-League club, Aizawl.

Kinowaki made his debut for Aizawl in the I-League on 9 January 2016 against the reigning champions, Mohun Bagan. He played the full match as Aizawl lost 3–1. After missing a home game against Bengaluru, he scored a goal against DSK Shivaijans, his first goal for Aizawl.

In August 2017 he joined Mohun Bagan A.C. as their 2nd Asian player.
On 4 December 2017 Kinowaki made his debut for Mohun Bagan against arch-rivals East Bengal in the I-league. He suffered a shoulder injury in his second match against Churchill Brothers and eventually had to leave the stadium in an ambulance. He was
ruled out for a month after dislocating collarbone.

Statistics

Honours

Club
Mohun Bagan
Calcutta Football League (1): 2018–19

References

External links 
 

1991 births
Living people
Japanese footballers
Kyoto Sanga FC players
Shillong Lajong FC players
Association football defenders
I-League players
Expatriate footballers in Poland
Expatriate footballers in Latvia
Expatriate footballers in India
BFC Daugavpils players
Japanese expatriate footballers
Calcutta Football League players